Holy Trinity Anglican Church is a large historic Carpenter Gothic style Anglican church building located at 40986 Western Road (PEI Route 2) in the unincorporated village of Alma, 4 miles north of Alberton, Prince Edward Island Canada. It was built of wood between 1888 and 1890 by local craftsmen Its steep pitched roof, lancet windows and entrance tower are typical of Carpenter Gothic churches. Its rear chancel has a separate roof line and appears to be an add on. The adjacent cemetery predates the church by one year. Because of its "well preserved carpenter Gothic architecture", its "association with the history of the Anglican Church in western Prince Edward Island" and "its contribution" to the community of Alma", it was designated a provincial heritage site by the province of Prince Edward Island on December 21, 2007.

See also

 Anglican Diocese of Nova Scotia and Prince Edward Island

References

Anglican church buildings in Prince Edward Island
Carpenter Gothic church buildings in Canada
19th-century Anglican church buildings in Canada
Heritage sites in Prince Edward Island
Churches in Prince County, Prince Edward Island